Termier is a surname. Notable people with the surname include:

 Geneviève Termier (1917–2005), French paleontologist and evolutionist
 Henri Termier (1897–1989), French geologist
 Pierre-Marie Termier (1859–1930), French geologist

French-language surnames